Kamyshi is a rural locality (a settlement) and the administrative center of Kamyshinsky Selsoviet Rural Settlement, Kursky District, Kursk Oblast, Russia. Population:

Geography 
The settlement is located on the Vinogrobl River (a left tributary of the Tuskar in the basin of the Seym), 102 km from the Russia–Ukraine border, 5 km north-east of the district center – the town Kursk.

 Streets
There are the following streets in the locality: Lesnaya, Mayskaya, Mirnaya, Molodyozhnaya, Sadovaya, Severomorskaya and Tayozhnaya (131 houses).

 Climate
Kamyshi has a warm-summer humid continental climate (Dfb in the Köppen climate classification).

Transport 
Kamyshi is located, 10 km from the federal route  Crimea Highway (a part of the European route ), 1 km from the road of regional importance  (Kursk – Ponyri), on the road of intermunicipal significance  (38K-018 – Kamyshi), 2 km from the railway junction 530 km (railway line Oryol – Kursk).

The rural locality is situated 6 km from Kursk Vostochny Airport, 130 km from Belgorod International Airport and 203 km from Voronezh Peter the Great Airport.

References

Notes

Sources

Rural localities in Kursky District, Kursk Oblast